Daam (lit. Price) is a Pakistani drama television series which premiered on ARY Digital on 11 June 2010 and last episode was aired on 15 October 2010. This drama has total 18 episodes.The series is directed by award winning TV director Mehreen Jabbar, is written by popular Urdu novelist Umera Ahmad and produced by Humayun Saeed and Abdullah Kadwani's production house 7th Sky Entertainment.

It was rebroadcast by ARY Network on ARY Zauq in 2013 and was also aired in India on Zindagi, premiering on 26 October 2015. The shows ended its run in India on 29 November 2015.

Cast and characters 

 Sanam Baloch as Zara Hidayatullah; a hardworking student of MBBS, Maleeha's best friend and classmate hails from underprivileged family
 Aamina Sheikh as Maleeha Sami; a confident student, Zara's best friend and classmate and Junaid's sister
 Adeel Hussain as Junaid Sami; Maleeha's brother
 Nimra Bucha as Aasma Hidayatullah; Zara's elder sister who works harder as a breadwinner of her family
 Sanam Saeed as Fiza; Maleeha's stubborn and arrogant cousin and classmate
 Pari Hashmi as Mano; Zara's intellectually challenged younger sister 
 Muhammad Yasir as Jamaal; Zara's brother who wants to aspire an actor
 Lubna Aslam as Amna; Zara's mother
 Shahid Naqvi as Hidayatullah; Zara's good-for-nothing father
 Faisal Shah as Yasir; Maleeha's fiancé and Fiza's brother
 Syed Mohammad Ahmed as Sami; Maleeha's father who is doctor by profession
 Parveen Malik as Maleeha's mother
 Behroze Sabzwari as Haji Sahab; Amna's brother who pretend to be pious
 Atif Badar as Ghulam Ali; Shopkeeper from Zara's neighborhood
 Farah Nadir as Sajida; Haji Sahab's wife
 Ahmed Zeb as Jibran; Fiza's fiancé
 Mohib Mirza as himself
 Gohar Rasheed as himself
 Azfar Rehman as himself
 Shehrzade Sheikh as himself
 Humayun Saeed as Hassan; Zara colleague in hospital (cameo)
 Aijaz Aslam as Fareed; Aasma's husband (cameo)

Plot
Zara Hidayatullah and Maleeha Sami were two close friends for a span of seven years. Zara belongs to a lower-middle-class family while Maleeha comes from an upper class household. Yet their class difference did not threaten their unbreakable bond. Maleeha had been there for her friend through many hardships, but she never really felt the extent of anguish which plagued Zara's life. The great blow to their friendship comes when Maleeha's elder brother Junaid, shows his interest in marrying Zara. Their parents have no objection to the union, but it comes as ashock to Maleeha. She thought that Zara was trapping her brother who is eligible in all means to live a better life. Maleeha's cousin Fiza, who is also Zara and Maleeha's class fellow, starts manipulating her against Zara. Meanwhile, Zara's family found the perfect suitor for her older sister Aasma whose marriage was a reason of depression for anyone. She promises Junaid that his family can approach hers with their proposal after her sister's marriage. But things didn't go as planned. Zara's father got imprisoned for deceit in a business scheme he was involved in. Her family needed to accumulate a large amount to pay for his bail, which they couldn't afford. Zara asks Maleeha for help, but Maleeha makes a bargain with her. She decided to give Zara the money only if she breaks things up with Junaid. Insulted, disdained and helpless, Zara agrees and gives Maleeha the pendant Junaid gifted to her as a token of his love. Junaid's family later approaches Zara, but she turns them down by saying that she is committed to one of her cousins. Meanwhile, Fiza starts to develop feelings for Junaid. When Junaid refuses, Fiza made life miserable for Maleeha and her husband Yasir who is also Fiza's brother. Zara in the meanwhile receives a 100% scholarship, and shifts to Glasgow for her further education. Moving to UK after a short period of time, Zara returns Maleeha every single penny which Maleeha had spent on her ever in the seven years of their friendship.
	
Seven years later, a professionally successful Zara reconnects with Junaid who is unhappily married to Fiza. Junaid discovers that Zara lied of her engagement, and was single all along. He confronts Maleeha and decides to divorce Fiza. Yasir threatens Maleeha of their own divorce if her Junaid abandons Fiza. Maleeha visits Zara to apologize for what she made her do. Zara who had no intentions of marrying Junaid tells Maleeha how deeply she loved him, and how unfair Maleeha had been. Maleeha regrets her awful behavior and realizes that she had lost two important people of her life. Thus she tells Junaid the truth and leaves Yasir on her own. Zara moves back to UK rejecting Junaid but saying it would be impossible for her to forget the memories which she made with him.

A year later,  Maleeha calls a happily married Zara to wish her birthday. When her husband asks who the caller was, Zara talks of her as an old class mate and not her once best friend symbolizing she had moved on for better.

Reception 

A reviewer from Dawn praised the several performances of the actors, including that of Baloch, Sheikh, Naqvi and Bucha but criticised the slow pace. Aslam's portrayal as a mother who always stands by her daughter was also praised.

While praising the Jabbar's direction and Ahmad's screenplay, DAWN Images listed it among the 10 iconic TV dramas.

Accolades

References

External links

 
Daam at ARY Digital
 
 

2010 Pakistani television series debuts
2010 Pakistani television series endings
Pakistani drama television series
Urdu-language television shows
Television shows set in Karachi
ARY Digital original programming
Mehreen Jabbar's directions